In October 2010, Elton John embarked on a short tour of the United States with Leon Russell to promote their new album The Union. The pair also made an appearance on the BBC Radio 2 Electric Proms in London, England. They also appeared at T-Bone Burnett's Speaking Clock Revue. Their performance of "Monkey Suit" is included on T Bone Burnett Presents: The Speaking Clock Revue which was released in late 2011.

Tour dates

Setlists

References

External links
 
 Information Site with Tour Dates

Elton John concert tours
2010 concert tours